Waiting for Santa (known as Barney's Happy Christmas in Australia) is a direct-to-video Christmas Eve special. Released on video on May 11, 1990 as part of the Barney & the Backyard Gang series, it features an array of traditional Christmas songs as well as new arrangements. The video had sold almost five million copies by 1999.

Plot
Everyone is asleep in Michael's house on Christmas Eve, except for him and his sister, Amy. They try to stay up to wait for Santa. They fall asleep, but are soon awakened by Barney who has gotten stuck trying to get down the chimney. Michael and Amy pull him out. After he is released, he magically brings the other kids there and then explains that Derek, a new boy in the neighborhood, is worried that Santa will not be able to see him. In addition, it is stated that he really wishes for some new friends more than anything else. Barney takes the gang to his house to get him and then they go on a magical sleigh ride to the North Pole to prove that Santa knows his new address. At the North Pole, they meet a snowman as well as go ice skating on a frozen pond. Afterwards, they meet Mrs. Claus and she proves to Derek that his new address is in Santa's computer and therefore he will be able to visit him. After some fun in Santa's workshop, they return home and Barney reads "A Visit from St. Nicholas" (also known as "Twas the Night Before Christmas") to Michael and Amy, unaware that Santa is there. They soon fall asleep. At the very end, a silhouette of Santa flies over the moon, shouting "Ho ho ho. Merry Christmas!"

Cast
 David Voss as Barney (body costume)
 Bob West as Barney (voice)
 Brian Eppes as Michael
 Becky Swonke as Amy
 Leah Montes as Luci
 Jessica Zucha as Tina
 Alexander Jhin as Adam
 Rickey Carter as Derek
 Bob West as the Snowman (voice)
 Jeanne Cairns as Mrs. Claus
 Henry Hammack as Santa Claus

Songs
 "Barney Theme Song" (tune: "Yankee Doodle")
 "When Santa Comes to our House"
 "Waiting for Santa"
 "I Love You" (tune: "This Old Man")
 "S-A-N-T-A" (tune: "B-I-N-G-O")
 "Star Light, Star Bright"
 "Up on the Housetop"
 "Jingle Bells"
 "Winter's Wonderful"
 "Skating, Skating" (tune: "Sailing, Sailing")
 "The Elves' Rap"
 "Let's All Do a Little Tapping" (tune: "We Wish You a Merry Christmas")
 "Jolly Old St. Nicholas"
 "We Wish You a Merry Christmas"
 "Deck the Halls"
 "'Twas the Night Before Christmas"

References

External links
 

1990 direct-to-video films
1990 television specials
1990s American television specials
American Christmas television specials
American direct-to-video films
Barney & Friends
Mattel Creations films
1990s English-language films